Rebecca Kapitire Ndjoze-Ojo (born 18 March 1956) is a Namibian politician and educator. A member of SWAPO, Ndjoze-Ojo has been a member of the National Assembly and Deputy Minister of Higher Education since 2005.

Career
From 1978 to 1986, Ndjoze-Ojo taught at various high schools in Windhoek's black and coloured townships of Katutura and Khomasdal. Leaving Namibia in 1986, she went to Nigeria, where she studied and taught at Ahmadu Bello University in Zaria. She returned to Namibia in 1996 and began working for the University of Namibia's language department, which is her specialization. An expert on language policy, she has promoted the use of Namibia's indigenous languages in education. Prior to the 2004 election, she was put on the electoral list for the ruling SWAPO party. SWAPO obtained 55 seats out of 72 and Ndjoze-Ojo entered the National Assembly. She was subsequently chosen as the Deputy Minister of Education.

Currently, Ndjoze-Ojo is the Principal of well-known Roman Catholic Church Private School, St Pauls in Windhoek.

References

1956 births
Living people
Politicians from Windhoek
Members of the National Assembly (Namibia)
Namibian educators
Ahmadu Bello University alumni
Alumni of Durham University
Alumni of Ulster University
Academic staff of the University of Namibia
SWAPO politicians
Government ministers of Namibia
21st-century Namibian women politicians
21st-century Namibian politicians
Women government ministers of Namibia
Namibian expatriates in Nigeria
Academic staff of Ahmadu Bello University
Women members of the National Assembly (Namibia)